The Ordovician Juniata Formation is a mapped bedrock unit in Pennsylvania and Maryland. It is a relative slope-former occurring between the two prominent ridge-forming sandstone units: the Tuscarora Formation and the Bald Eagle Formation in the Appalachian Mountains.

Description

The Juniata is defined as a grayish-red to greenish-gray, thin- to thick-bedded siltstone, shale, and very fine to medium-grained crossbedded sandstone or subgraywacke and protoquartzite with interbedded conglomerate.
The Juniata is a lateral equivalent of the Queenston Shale in western Pennsylvania.

Depositional environment
The depositional environment of the Juniata has always been interpreted as mostly terrestrial or shallow marine deposits resulting in a molasse sequence produced by the Taconic orogeny.

Fossils
Very few fossils exist in the Juniata Formation, but different types of trace fossils such as tracks and burrows can commonly be found.

Age
Relative age dating of the Juniata places it in the Upper Ordovician period, being deposited between 488.3 and 443.7 (±10) million years ago. It rests conformably atop the Bald Eagle Formation in Pennsylvania and the Martinsburg Formation in Maryland, and conformably below the Tuscarora Formation.

Economic use 
The Juniata is a good source of road material, riprap and building stone.

References

See also 
 Geology of Pennsylvania

Ordovician System of North America
Upper Ordovician Series
Sandstone formations of the United States
Siltstone formations
Shale formations of the United States
Geologic formations of Maryland
Geologic formations of Pennsylvania
Geologic formations of Tennessee
Geologic formations of Virginia
Ordovician West Virginia
Ordovician Maryland
Ordovician geology of Pennsylvania
Ordovician geology of Tennessee
Ordovician geology of Virginia